Kivarz may refer to:
Kivarz-e Olya, a village in Iran
Kivarz-e Sofla, a village in Iran